This is a list of mayors and city managers of Lowell, Massachusetts. Lowell became a city in 1836.  From 1836 to 1943 the mayor of Lowell was the chief administrative officer of the city.  Lowell switched to a Massachusetts "Plan E" form of city government in 1943, since January 1, 1944 the city has been administrated by a professional city manager, the office of mayor, while retained under "Plan E", is strictly a ceremonial one.

Mayors

City Managers

References

External links
 List of the mayors of Lowell from The University of Massachusetts Lowell

Lowell
Lowell